Davis v. United States, 564 U.S. 229 (2011), was a case in which the Supreme Court of the United States "[held] that searches conducted in objectively reasonable reliance on binding appellate precedent are not subject to the exclusionary rule".

References

External links
 

2011 in United States case law
United States Supreme Court cases
United States Fourth Amendment case law
United States Supreme Court cases of the Roberts Court